Simalungun, or Batak Simalungun, is an Austronesian language of Sumatra. It is spoken mainly in Simalungun Regency and Pematang Siantar, North Sumatra, Indonesia.

References

External links 
 Indonesian-Simalungun Dictionary
 David Goldsworthy's collection of Music of Indonesia and Malaysia archived with Paradisec includes open access recordings in Batak Simalungun.

Batak languages
Languages of Indonesia